Tyla-Jay Vlajnic (born 6 November 1990) is an Australian-born Serbian footballer who plays for A-League Women club Western United and the Serbia women's national team. She previously played for Melbourne City in the A-League Women, Calder United in the Women's National Premier League, Bulleen Lions in the National Premier Leagues Victoria Women, Seattle Sounders in the American Women's Premier Soccer League (WPSL), and for Spartak Subotica in the Serbian Women's Super League.

Playing career

Melbourne City 
During the 2015–16 W-League season, Vlajnic made one appearance during the team's 2–1 win over Melbourne Victory on 25 October 2015. During the match, she made a goal line save to prevent the Victory from scoring. Melbourne City finished in first place during the regular season with an undefeated  record. They won the 2016 W-League Grand Final after defeating Sydney FC 4–1.

After re-signing with the club for the 2016–17 W-League season, Vlajnic made nine appearances and helped the club finish the regular season in fourth place with a  record and advanced to the playoffs. The team won back-to-back Grand Finals after defeating Perth Glory in the 2017 W-League Grand Final.

Vljajnic re-signed with Melbourne City for the 2017–18 W-League season in September 2017.

In September 2022, it was announced that Vlajnic had departed Melbourne City after making 55 appearances in which the club won two premierships and four championships.

Loan to Seattle Sounders
During the summer of 2017, Vlajnic played for the Seattle Sounders in the Women's Premier Soccer League (WPSL) in the United States. She made seven appearances and helped the club finish in first place in the Northwest Conference with a  record.

Bulleen Lions
In March 2022, Vlajnic returned to Bulleen Lions. Vlajnic left before the club's National Premier Leagues Victoria Women Final against Calder United, which they lost 2–0.

Spartak Subotica
In August 2022, Vlajnic signed with Serbian club Spartak Subotica. She debuted for the club as a substitute for the second half of their 2022–23 Champions League qualifying match against Brann which they lost 3–1.

Western United
In September 2022, Vlajnic joined new A-League Women expansion club Western United, looking forward to the challenge of an inaugural season.

Honours
 with Melbourne City
Grand Final Winner: 2016, 2017

References

External links
 Melbourne City player profile

1990 births
Living people

Serbian women's footballers
Women's association football defenders
Seattle Sounders Women players
Serbia women's international footballers
Serbian expatriate women's footballers
Serbian expatriate sportspeople in the United States
Expatriate women's soccer players in the United States
Australian women's soccer players
Melbourne City FC (A-League Women) players
ŽFK Spartak Subotica players
Western United FC (A-League Women) players
A-League Women players
Australian people of Serbian descent
Australian expatriate soccer players
Australian expatriate sportspeople in the United States